Regenerating islet-derived protein 4 is a protein that in humans is encoded by the REG4 gene.

References

Further reading